69th parallel may refer to:

69th parallel north, a circle of latitude in the Northern Hemisphere
69th parallel south, a circle of latitude in the Southern Hemisphere
69th parallel, a pornographic film starring Kyle Stone